Yehuda Levi (born June 29, 1979) is an Israeli actor and model. His breakthrough role was in the TV series Lechayey Ha'ahava (Here's To Love, 2001).

Early life 
Levi was born in Petah Tikva, Israel. His father Yerachmiel Levi was born in Bulgaria to a family of Sephardi Jewish descent, whereas his mother Chaya (née Lichtenstein) was born in Poland to a family of Ashkenazi Jewish descent. At age four, their family moved to South Africa where his father worked at the time; a decade later, at age fourteen, they moved back to Israel. He graduated from the Thelma Yellin High School of the Arts in Givatayim, Israel.

During his Israel Defense Forces service, he was a commander of the military band of the Education Corps.

Career 
He is an established actor, and came to the attention of the Israeli public through his soap opera roles. In May 2006, HaAlufa (The Champion), a soap opera centered on a soccer team, premiered starring Levi as the main character and captain of the team "Hakoakh Yerushalayim" (Jerusalem Power). In 2014 he began playing a famous celebrity called Yehuda Levi in the Hot TV series, A Very Important Man. He also has the lead role as a Mossad trainer in the Channel 2 series, Mossad 101 that began airing in 2015.

His film roles include Jagger in Yossi & Jagger.

He was the spokesmodel of Israeli fashion brands Fox and Renuar.

On 12 March 2023, Levi was announced as the new host of HaMerotz LaMillion, Israel's version of The Amazing Race, replacing longtime host Ron Shahar.

Personal life 
Levi was previously in a relationship with the Israeli model Yael Bar Zohar and acted alongside her in the soap opera, Ramat Aviv Gimel. In 2006, Levi got into a high-profile relationship with Israeli singer and actress Ninet Tayeb, the first winner of the show Kokhav Nolad. Haaretz described them as "Israel's favourite celebrity couple", with The Jerusalem Post declaring them "Israel's Brangelina".  In 2013, after 8 years together, the couple broke up, stating that the breakup was mutual. He has been described as one of the two most talked-about male stars in Israel (along with Ran Danker), Tayeb's former partner.

In 2017, he married Israeli model Shlomit Malka. They resided in Tel Aviv. On June 6, 2021, the couple announced that they separated.

Filmography

Film

Television

Awards and nominations

References

External links

 
 

1979 births
Israeli male film actors
Israeli Ashkenazi Jews
Israeli people of Bulgarian-Jewish descent
Israeli people of Polish-Jewish descent
Israeli male television actors
Israeli male models
Jewish male models
Jewish Israeli male actors
Living people
Israeli Sephardi Jews